This is a list of weapons of the French Army during the Cold War. During the early period of the Cold War France was fighting colonial wars such as the First Indochina War and the Algerian War the same as other colonial powers of the time like Britain and the Netherlands. Despite France withdrawing from NATO in 1966 it did still cooperate with NATO and made  plans to reinforce NATO with French Army units against a Soviet invasion as can be seen from the formation of the Rapid Action Force which was intended to reinforce NATO troops in the event of a conflict.

Small arms

Rifles 

 MAS-36 rifle- Used in World War II  by France equipped second line units. 
 MAS-49 rifle- Semiauto rifle and main French service rifle of Cold War. 
 FAMAS-Automatic bullpup Replaced MAS 49 and MAT 49 in 1978.

Sniper rifles 

 FR F2 sniper rifle- Replaced FR F1 bear end of Cold War.

Sidearms 

 Pistolet automatique modèle 1935A-Standard French sidearm of World War II. 
 Pistolet automatique modèle 1935S- French WWII era sidearm. 
 MAC Mle 1950- Main French sidearm of the Cold War.

Machine guns 

 FM 24/29 light machine gun- Standard French light machine gun of World War II.
 AA-52 machine gun- Standard French machine gun during Cold War.

Submachine guns 

 MAT-49- Standard French machine gun of the Cold War.

Anti-tank weapons 

 Super Bazooka
 LRAC F1-Replaced Super Bazooka in the 1970s.
 MILAN

Mortars 

 Brandt Mle 27/31
 Brandt Mle 1935
 M2 mortar

Artillery

Self propelled 
 M41 Howitzer Motor Carriage

Armoured fighting vehicles(AFV's)

Tanks 

 AMX-30

Light tanks 

 M24 Chaffee
 AMX-13

Armoured cars 

 Panhard EBR
 Panhard AML
 AMX-10 RC

Infantry fighting vehicles(IFV's) 

 AMX-VCI
 AMX-10P

Armoured personnel carriers(APC's) 

 Véhicule de l'Avant Blindé

References

Cold War
Cold War weapons of France
Military equipment by country